William John Connell (21 January 1891 – 14 April 1945) was an Australian politician.

He was born in Launceston. In January 1919 he was elected to the Tasmanian House of Assembly as a Nationalist member for Wilmot in a recount following Edward Mulcahy's resignation. He was defeated at the state election held in May 1919. Connell died in St Leonards in 1945.

References

1891 births
1945 deaths
Nationalist Party of Australia members of the Parliament of Tasmania
Members of the Tasmanian House of Assembly
20th-century Australian politicians